Parendacustes is a genus of crickets (Orthoptera: Ensifera) in the family Phalangopsidae, tribe Phalangopsini, subtribe Parendacustina.  Species have been recorded from Indo-China (although no Vietnam records to date), Malesia and New Guinea.

Species
The Orthoptera Species File lists:
subgenus Minizacla Gorochov, 2003

 Parendacustes brevispina Gorochov, 2017
 Parendacustes buton Gorochov, 2017
 Parendacustes chopardi Gorochov, 2003
 Parendacustes derelicta Gorochov, 2006
 Parendacustes doloduo Gorochov, 2017
 Parendacustes forficula Chopard, 1930
 Parendacustes glandulosus Gorochov, 1996
 Parendacustes kendari Gorochov, 2017
 Parendacustes lindu Gorochov, 2017
 Parendacustes longispina Gorochov, 2017
 Parendacustes makassari Gorochov, 2006
 Parendacustes minutus Chopard, 1954
 Parendacustes modispina Gorochov, 2017
 Parendacustes mulu Gorochov, 2017
 Parendacustes nitens Gorochov, 2005
 Parendacustes pallescens Gorochov, 2017
 Parendacustes papua Gorochov, 2018
 Parendacustes sulawesi Gorochov, 2003
 Parendacustes supiori Gorochov, 2006
 Parendacustes trusmadi Gorochov, 2017
 Parendacustes wasile Gorochov, 2018

subgenus Parendacustes Chopard, 1924

Parendacustes arachne Gorochov, 2017
Parendacustes berezini Gorochov, 2017
Parendacustes cavicola Chopard, 1924 - type species
Parendacustes dohmi Gorochov, 2003
 Parendacustes ectoparameralis Gorochov, 2017
 Parendacustes handschini Chopard, 1937
 Parendacustes javanus Chopard, 1925
 Parendacustes kerinci Gorochov, 2003
 Parendacustes khaosoki Gorochov, 2003
 Parendacustes latifrons Chopard, 1969
 Parendacustes magnispeculum Gorochov, 2017
 Parendacustes pahangi Gorochov, 2003
 Parendacustes pendleburyi Chopard, 1969
 Parendacustes pictus Chopard, 1925
 Parendacustes sanyali Bhowmik, 1970
 Parendacustes sylvestris Gorochov, 2017
 Parendacustes tawau Gorochov, 2017
 Parendacustes testaceus Chopard, 1930
 Parendacustes tioman Gorochov, 2017
 Parendacustes tkatshevae Gorochov, 2017
 Parendacustes umbra Gorochov, 2005

References

External links
 

Orthoptera of Indo-China
Ensifera genera
crickets